Moka is the debut solo album from Japanese singer Kaori Mochida. It was released on August 12, 2009.

Track listing

CD
AVCD-23901

 
 Drop
  
 weather
 
 ABC
 Real and Imagined
 
 
 
 
 Every day Love

DVD
AVCD-23901
Tao (Video clip)
Ame no Waltz & Shizuka na Yoru video clip OFF-SHOT & "Moka" Photo Shoot OFF-SHOT

Charts

External links
Kaori Mochida discography on Avex

2009 albums